Periere is a French last name.

Péreire brothers, 19th century French financiers
Friedrich von Arnauld de la Perière, a German pilot and General
Lothar von Arnauld de la Perière, a German naval officer